The BBC Two "Curve" idents have been broadcast since 27 September 2018 on BBC Two in the United Kingdom. The identity was developed by BBC Creative and branding agency Superunion, and consists of various animations based around a curve motif resembling a '2' in the centre. The "Curve" set pay homage to BBC Two's past use of its idents through the 1990s. The initial set of idents consists of sixteen sequences, created by various animators from around the world, including Aardman Animations, The Mill, and Buck.

The ident package was retained following the corporate rebrand of the BBC on 20 October 2021 with the 2021 BBC logo being placed at the top of the screen while "TWO" remains at the bottom, with the font changed to BBC Reith Sans. Illuminating was the first ident to feature the updated branding at 6:30am.

Idents

Regular idents

Special idents

Christmas idents

See also

 History of BBC television idents

References

External links

BBC Two
BBC Idents
Television presentation in the United Kingdom